Ancistrus galani is a species of catfish in the family Loricariidae. It is native to South America, where it occurs only in Los Laureles Cave, at an elevation of 650 m (2133 ft) above sea level, in the Socuy River basin, which is part of the Lake Maracaibo drainage system in the state of Zulia in Venezuela. The species reaches 5.6 cm (2.2 inches) SL and was named after Carlos Galan, a Venezuelan speleologist. A. galani differs from most Ancistrus species (except for other cave-dwelling species like A. cryptophthalmus or A. formoso) in having an unpigmented body, atrophied or entirely absent eyes, and highly reduced ocular orbits, which are all thought to be adaptations to its dark subterranean habitat and stygobitic lifestyle.

References 

galani
Fish described in 1994
Fish of Venezuela